The Eddington Medal is awarded by the Royal Astronomical Society for investigations of outstanding merit in theoretical astrophysics. It is named after Sir Arthur Eddington. First awarded in 1953, the frequency of the prize has varied over the years, at times being every one, two or three years. Since 2013 it has been awarded annually.

Recipients 
Source is  unless otherwise noted.

See also

 List of astronomy awards
 List of physics awards
 List of prizes named after people

References

External links 
 Winners

Astronomy prizes
Physics awards
Awards established in 1953
British science and technology awards
Astronomy in the United Kingdom
Royal Astronomical Society
1953 establishments in the United Kingdom